Richard Rekhy served as the Chief Executive Officer of KPMG in India from October 2012 till early February 2017 after he announced his retirement in 2016. 

Richard has over 28 years of multi layered, multi sectoral, top-of-the-pyramid experience behind him. He has served clients across sectors including advertising, oil and gas, industrial and consumer markets and specifically in the pharmaceuticals, technology, manufacturing and retail domains. He comes with real time extensive experience coupled with detailed understanding of corporate governance, enterprise risk management, internal audit and business processes re-engineering.

Richard is on the National Council of CII and chairs their Northern Region Economic Affairs and Taxation Committee. He is a member of the National Executive Committee of CII for Corporate Governance and on the Board of the prestigious American Chambers of Commerce (AMCHAM).

Richard was recently appointed as the Chairman of Enactus India, which is an international non-profit organisation. He is also a member of the EMA and Global Board for KPMG International.

On 6 November 2016 Richard announced that he would be retiring from the firm.

Richard is an articulate and eloquent speaker, contributing  at several public forums while providing thought leadership through articles in  leading newspapers and magazines on diverse topics - corporate governance/risk management, leadership and the economy. He gave a TEDx Talk in January, 2016 on Higher Purpose in Life

Education
Richard qualified as a Chartered Accountant in the year 1983 and a B.Com (Hons), Accounting, taxation, Economics from Delhi University.

Association with KPMG India

Past Major Experiences

Retirement from KPMG
In October 2012, Rekhy took over as India CEO of KPMG. From the year 2014 to 2016, as many as 60 partners steadily quit the KPMG India to join PwC, Deloitte and Ernst and Young. Increasing politicisation, some conflict of interest issues and arbitrary organisational changes," were among the reasons for the brewing disaffection.  This sparked complaints by partners over Rekhy’s management style, as a result Richard Rekhy’s leadership role at KPMG India was curtailed by the KPMG Global leadership by handing over effective charge to deputy CEO Akhil Bansal.
On 6 November 2016, a Week after the global leadership made changes to the KPMG India leadership team, Richard Rekhy, the incumbent CEO of the firm, advised KPMG India Board of his decision to retire as CEO of the India firm. In a statement, by accepting his retirement, the firm said: "The India Board, after due deliberations and after recognising Richard’s stellar professional and personal contributions to the India firm over the last many years as the CEO and in his prior leadership roles, respectfully accepted Richard’s decision to retire."

References

Living people
Delhi University alumni
Indian chief executives
KPMG people
Year of birth missing (living people)